The 93rd Air Refueling Squadron is an active United States Air Force unit, stationed at Fairchild Air Force Base, Washington, where it is assigned to the 92nd Operations Group and operates the Boeing KC-135 Stratotanker aircraft conducting air refueling missions.

The earliest predecessor of the squadron is the 493rd Bombardment Squadron, which was activated in India in October 1942 and was equipped with Consolidated B-24 Liberators in January 1943.  It participated in combat in the China Burma India Theater with the Liberator until V-J Day, earning a Distinguished Unit Citation in March 1945.  Dring the period in which Boeing B-29 Superfortress bombers operated from India, it also transported gasoline to forward bases in China.  After the end of hostilities, it returned to the United States for inactivation in January 1946.

The 93rd Air Refueling Squadron was activated in March 1949 and equipped with Boeing KB-29 Superfortress tankers. It upgraded to the Boeing KC-97 Stratofreighter in 1953, and the KC-135 in 1957.  For most of its time at Castle Air Force Base, California, it served as the training unit for KC-135 aircrews, but also maintained combat readiness to execute Strategic Air Command (SAC) missions.  In September 1985 the two squadrons were consolidated into a single unit.  When SAC inactivated in 1992, the squadron became part of Air Mobility Command.  In March 1995, the squadron moved on paper to Fairchild.

History

World War II
The squadron was first activated as the 493rd Bombardment Squadron in nonoperational status at Karachi, India, and assigned to the 7th Bombardment Group on 25 Oct 1942. The squadron remained unmanned while the older squadrons of the 7th Group were converting to the Consolidated B-24 Liberator. When the group and squadron moved to Pandaveswar Airfield in early January 1943 it became operational with Liberators. It commenced combat operations on 26 Jan 1943.

The squadron engaged in strategic bombardment operations, attacking communications targets (roads, railroads, etc.) in central and southern Burma, all without fighter escort due to the long distances involved. Primary targets were oil refineries, docks, depots, enemy airfields, marshalling yards, bridges, locomotive repair sheds, naval vessels, and troop concentrations. The 493rd moved to Tezgaon Airfield, India, on 17 Jun 1944, and assumed a new mission: transporting high-octane gasoline over the Hump to bases in China. This mission lasted until 5 October, at which time the squadron moved back to Pandaveswar to resume bombing missions. A detachment of the 493rd Squadron operated from Luliang Airfield, China from 17 December 1944 until 26 January 1945, hauling gasoline to Suichwan Airfield, China.

The squadron proper began practice with Azon ("Azimuth only") manual command to line of sight bombs. Apparently the squadron was the only USAAF unit to use this weapon outside of the European Theater of World War II. The Azon bombs were radio controlled and could be steered left or right, although their trajectory could not be changed to shorten or lengthen their flight to target. The Azon trained crews and their B-24s were initially assigned to the 9th Bombardment Squadron. However, in December 1944, the crews and planes were reassigned to the 493rd and Azon missions began to be flown. Azon proved effective in attacks against bridges and rail lines. In early 1945 the squadron concentrated on attacks against the Burma-Thailand railroad, the most important line left to the enemy in Burma. On 19 March, the 493rd earned a Distinguished Unit Citation for attacks against rail lines and bridges in Thailand. The squadron also dropped propaganda leaflets in Thailand from June through September 1945 for the Office of War Information.

After fighting ended in Burma the 493rd Bomb Squadron was ordered to practice Azon bombing in China, but soon "alerted" for inactivation. The vessel reached the U.S. on 5 January 1946 and the squadron inactivated at Camp Kilmer, New Jersey, the following day

Strategic Air Command
Activated on 1 Mar 1949 as the 93rd Air Refueling Squadron, Medium, but was not manned until September 1950. Received KB-29P Superfortress tankers, October 1950-Jun 1951. Became combat ready in October 1951. The 93rd ARS deployed to RAF Upper Heyford, England, 6 Dec 1951 – 6 Mar 1952, while the parent wing was at nearby RAF Mildenhall. The squadron supported Operation FOX PETER II, the movement of the 31st Fighter-Escort Wing from the U.S. to Japan, in July 1952 using 11 KB-29Ps at Guam and Kwajalein to refuel some 58 F-84G fighters on their way to the Korean War. The squadron converted from KB-29s to KC-97G Stratotankers in November and December 1953. It undertook several oversea deployments, to Newfoundland, Greenland, French Morocco, and Alaska, in 1954–1956.

The 93rd ARS began training its aircrews to operate Boeing KC-135 Stratotankers in May 1957. The squadron was the first Stratotanker squadron in the Air Force. It Began receiving KC-135s on 28 Jun 1957, three days after converting to KC-135 aircrew training as primary mission. Possessed 19 tankers in December 1957 and 39 by May 1958.

Effective 1 Jul 1959, the resources of the 93rd ARS were divided with the 924th ARS, which unit assumed the SAC KC-135 aircrew training mission with 15 aircraft. The 93rd ARS, at the same time, resumed full-time air refueling with 20 KC-135s. This status lasted until 21 Aug 1963, when the 93rd ARS ceased standing alert and prepared to resume full-time KC-135 aircrew training. On 26 August the 93rd once again began KC-135 aircrew training as its primary mission. It retained Emergency War Order (EWO) commitments along with its training mission, but did not stand alert.

Modern era
The squadron's mission remained basically the same until 31 Mar 1995. Thousands of Strategic Air Command and some Air Mobility Command KC-135 aircrews received flight training from the 93 ARS. Each crew (pilot, copilot, navigator, and boom operator), after academic training with the 4017th Training Squadron at Castle AFB, received 45 days of flight training from the 93rd ARS. The squadron also provided specialized training of shorter duration to senior officers (such as wing commanders). For a period the 93rd ARS also sent instructor teams to locations where Air Force Reserve and Air National Guard units were converting to KC-135 tanker operations to help in-house training programs. On rare occasions the 93rd had deployed some of its aircraft and crews to meet its own EWO commitments or to meet needs exceeding the capability of the 924th ARS. A few such deployments occurred in 1980. With the BRAC-directed closure of Castle AFB, On 31 Mar 1995, the 93 ARS relocated to Fairchild AFB, Washington, and became a deployable air refueling squadron under the 92nd Air Refueling Wing (92 ARW).

Lineage
 493rd Bombardment Squadron
 Constituted as the 493rd Bombardment Squadron (Heavy) on 19 September 1942
 Activated on 25 October 1942
 Redesignated 493rd Bombardment Squadron, Heavy on 6 March 1944
 Inactivated on 6 January 1946
 Consolidated with the 93rd Air Refueling Squadron as the 93rd Air Refueling Squadron on 19 September 1985

 93rd Air Refueling Squadron
 Constituted as the 93rd Air Refueling Squadron, Medium on 2 February 1949
 Activated on 1 March 1949
 Redesignated 93rd Air Refueling Squadron, Heavy on 1 February 1955
 Redesignated 93rd Air Refueling Squadron on 1 September 1991
 Inactivated on 31 March 1995
 Consolidated with the 493rd Bombardment Squadron on 19 September 1985
 Activated on 31 March 1995

Assignments
 7th Bombardment Group, 25 October 1942 – 6 January 1946
 93rd Bombardment Group, 1 March 1949 (attached to 93rd Bombardment Wing, 15 July 1950 – 30 January 1951 and after 10 February 1951
 93rd Bombardment Wing, 16 June 1952
 93rd Operations Group, 1 September 1991
 398th Operations Group, 1 June 1992 – 31 March 1995
 92nd Operations Group, 31 March 1995 – present

Stations

 Karachi, India, 25 October 1942
 Pandaveswar Airfield, India, 7 January 1943
 Tezgaon Airfield, India, 17 June 1944
 Pandaveswar Airfield, India, 5 October 1944
 Detachment at Luliang Airfield, China 17 December 1944 – 26 January 1945
 Dudhkundi Airfield, India, 31 October 1945
 Kanchrapara Airfield, India, 19 November 1945
 Camp Angus, India, 25 November – 7 December 1945
 Camp Kilmer, New Jersey, 5–6 January 1946

Castle Air Force Base, California, 1 March 1949 – 31 March 1995
 Deployed to RAF Upper Heyford, England, 9 December 1951 – 6 March 1952
 Deployed to Davis-Monthan Air Force Base, Arizona 1 April – 15 May 1954
 Deployed to Ernest Harmon Air Force Base, Newfoundland, 19 June – 14 August 1954
 Deployed to Thule Air Base, Greenland, 19 January – c. 15 March 1955
 Deployed to Elmendorf Air Force Base, Alaska, 2 November 1955 – 5 January 1956, 27 September – c. 24 December 1956
 Fairchild Air Force Base, Washington, 31 March 1995 – present

Aircraft
Consolidated B-24 Liberator (1943–1945)
Boeing KB-29 Superfortress (1950–1953)
Boeing KC-97 Stratofreighter (1953–1957)
Boeing KC-135 Stratotanker (1957–1995, 1995–present)

See also

References

Notes
 Explanatory notes

 Citations

Bibliography

 
 
 
 

 Further reading

External links
 

Military units and formations in Washington (state)
093